Velashjerd (also Romanized as Velāshjerd; also known as Vāl Shāgerd and Wāla Shāgird) is a village in Miyan Rud Rural District, Qolqol Rud District, Tuyserkan County, Hamadan Province, Iran. At the 2006 census, its population was 1,348, in 286 families.

References 

Populated places in Tuyserkan County